Peter Ferdinand Pearson (born August 12, 1955) is an American former professional tennis player.

Tennis career
A left-handed player from California, Pearson was active on tour in the 1970s and 1980s. He made two quarter-finals on the Grand Prix circuit and took Vitas Gerulaitis to a final set tiebreak in a loss at the 1976 Fischer-Grand Prix. In 1978 he featured in the singles main draw of the French Open, where he fell in the first round to Tonino Zugarelli.

Prison
Pearson is serving a life sentence at a state prison in Tuolumne County, California, after committing a series of bank robberies. Previously imprisoned on drug and theft charges, he was sentenced under California's three-strikes law.

See also
List of professional sportspeople convicted of crimes

References

External links
 
 

1955 births
Living people
American male tennis players
Tennis people from California
American male criminals
American people convicted of robbery
American prisoners sentenced to life imprisonment
American sportspeople convicted of crimes
Criminals from California
Prisoners sentenced to life imprisonment by California
Sportspeople from Sunnyvale, California